Invasion America is a 1998 American animated science fiction series that aired in the prime time lineup on The WB. Produced by DreamWorks Television Animation (then part of DreamWorks proper, now owned by Universal Studios), the series was created by Steven Spielberg and Harve Bennett, who also served as executive producers.

The show involves an attempt by aliens from the planet Tyrus to overthrow the Earth.

Plot 
The story of Invasion America begins in the early 1980s, when humanoid aliens from the planet Tyrus begin to initiate their plans for making contact with Earth. Cale-Oosha, the ruler of Tyrus, looks into his uncle's project with Earth. However, his uncle, The Dragit, claims that their dying planet ought to invade Earth and take hold of its resources. Cale refuses, and a civil war breaks out.

Cale and Rafe, his bodyguard, trainer, and trusted friend, escape to Earth, disguising themselves as humans. Cale meets Rita Carter, a human woman; he falls in love with her, and they marry. After a long time of running from the Dragit's forces on Earth, Cale returns to Tyrus to help strengthen his loyalist forces, the Ooshati, leaving Rita and their young son, David, under Rafe's protection.

In the present day, when the Dragit finally finds the family, he is determined to kill them, and David Carter's teenage life is thrown into a devastating adventure of stopping the Dragit, losing and gaining friends, and finding out just who he is.

Characters 
 David Carter (Oosha) (voiced by Mikey Kelley) - The main character of the story, a teenage half-human Tyrusian and the future ruler of Tyrus. David lost his house, his mother and his possessions, and learned the truth of his identity all in one night. Possessing royalty in his blood, he discovers he can harness his Tyrusian powers. However, this is difficult for him to do of his own accord so he needs the help of the Exotar, a glove that enhances these powers.
 Rafe (voiced by Edward Albert) – Somewhat like an uncle to David, he goes undercover as a county sheriff in Glenport, but is, in reality, a commander in the Ooshati forces. Rafe was told by Cale, his friend and king, to watch over David and his mother. Only a day after he rescues David from a group of captors, he is asked to lead an attack on the Dragit's headquarters on Earth. After this successful attack, during which all other involved Ooshati were killed, Rafe succumbs to wounds inflicted by a stowaway Mangler. Right before he dies, he gives encouragement to David and passes on the task of saving the world.
 Rita Carter (Ooshala) (voiced by Kath Soucie) – David's human mother. She is a kind woman who saved Cale from death and eventually married him. When a group of Tall Men invade her house, Rita holds them at bay with a gun while she tells David to get out of the house. The orb Cale gave to her before his departure years ago suddenly activates during this ordeal and, shortly thereafter, the house implodes, and Rita and the Tall Men disappear with it. As of now, her fate is still uncertain.
 Cale-Oosha (voiced by Lorenzo Lamas) – David's Tyrusian father, and the true ruler of Tyrus. After a few years of staying on the run, he leaves his family under Rafe's protection to help his band of loyalist forces, known as the Ooshati, in their war against the Dragit.
 The Dragit (voiced by Tony Jay) – The lead antagonist of the story, and David's great-uncle. He currently has control over much of the Tyrusian armed forces, and is figured as a great orator and dictator, possibly having almost complete control over Tyrus. Although this is uncertain, his forces appear far larger and sophisticated than the ragged band of Ooshati. Throughout the story, the Dragit tries to brainwash David into joining his side or to have him killed.
 Major Philip 'Phil' Stark (voiced by Greg Eagles) – An intelligence officer and pilot of an OH-6A Cayuse. He has a heart for David and cares for his safety, going around his orders to help him out. Stark's original search started with the discovery of a Mangler skeleton in a cave where Rafe's fingerprints were found. He was also once school buddies with the President of the United States.
 Sergeant Angela "Angie" Romar (voiced by Kristy McNichol) – Stark's partner and friend. Proud of her Gypsy heritage and a brave young woman, she accompanies Stark wherever he goes. Romar is also the one who usually plants the ideas and advice into Stark's head. The two agents at one point hid David in her apartment.
 Jim Bailey (voiced by Rider Strong) – David's best friend. He helped support David through some of his toughest trials, and eventually went with him into outer space on the final mission of the story.
 Doc (voiced by Ronny Cox) – A Tyrusian once positioned in Charles Air Force Base, he deserted upon hearing of the Dragit's attempt to assassinate Cale and "went native." Now an old man living in the middle of the Utah desert, Doc initially stayed away from any involvement in the war against the Dragit. However, knowing what David was up against and seeing his spirit, he eventually changed his mind and tapped into the Dragit's information network, becoming a big help in the final mission.
 Blue – Doc's pet Mangler. Like Doc, Blue is a survivor of the attempted assassination of Cale-Oosha. Doc tamed Blue, who has quite an appetite for steaks. Though Doc believed that Blue only cared for the meat, Blue nearly attacks and is shot by a police officer who assaulted Doc. Later, while hiding in the Florida swamps, Blue hunted alligators for Doc to cook for David and his companions.
 General Konrad (voiced by Leonard Nimoy) – The first main antagonist as the show begins, a Tyrusian who has risen to the rank of an Air Force general. He is the leader of the Dragit's agents on Earth. Konrad is a seemingly heartless man who releases Manglers on his own men in an attempt to kill Ooshati warriors. After the destruction of Charles Air Force Base, he tries to kill David and Rafe, but David is successful in turning the situation around. As a direct result, Konrad dies in a plane crash.
 General Gordon (voiced by James Sikking) – Once a colonel, he is promoted after General Konrad is killed. Gordon directs Stark and Romar's missions when the two agents become suspicious. Later, it is confirmed that he led the attack on Maple Island to capture David and Rafe. Gordon also ordered his men to shoot down Stark and Romar's OH-6A Cayuse when the two attempted their own investigation. When the space shuttle lifted off for the moon, he tried to follow in a stealth fighter and shoot it down, but flew too high for the fighter to take and fell back to Earth. Gordon is presumed dead.
 Major Lomack (voiced by Jim Cummings) – An alien humanoid from the planet Chaon with the ability to morph into a hulking, fearsome creature as well as imitate other beings, including humans. When in his real form, Lomack is relatively immune to bullets and other weapons.
 Simon Lear (voiced by Thom Adcox-Hernandez) – A human/Tyrusian hybrid like David, he and his sister are bounty hunters working for General Gordon who attempts to capture David. He and his sister are their mother's only successful attempt at blending the two species DNA. He has a hissing voice and an anger management problem, often resorting to killing without thought. After losing a fight to David, Simon takes Jim hostage and threatens to kill him, convincing David to come with him and Sonia. He then tries to kill David by enhancing his Tyrusian powers using the Exotar, but the Exotar twists and crushes his hand, just as Rafe warned would happen, if any but the rightful heir attempted to wear it.
 Sonia Lear (voiced by Kath Soucie) – Simon's twin sister, a human/Tyrusian hybrid like David and fellow bounty hunter, also after David. She keeps Simon under control through Tyrusian psychic bonding; in turn, she loses her nerve and sense of violence without him. While hiding from security on an island to board a space shuttle to the moon, Simon tries to help General Gordon find the group by coming back into contact with his sister, but Sonia, now helping David and his friends, leads them away. Is implied to have romantic feelings for David.
 Dr. Hazel Lear – Sonia and Simon's "mother," a geneticist who, for years, tried to combine the genes of Tyrusians and humans with mostly failed results. Unable to wait any longer, General Gordon orders Major Lomack to kill her as a hidden Sonia watches in safety.

Episodes 
Invasion America consisted of 13 half-hour episodes, and was shown as five one-hour segments and one hour-and-a-half segment for the final episode.

Reception 
The show received a mixed reception from critics. Howard Rosenberg of The Los Angeles Times gave the show a largely negative review, criticizing the writing and "thin plot". Anita Gates of The New York Times noted that the animation was "impressive", but at the same time that "there's no heart in it". The Sun Sentinel wrote that the cartoon leaves viewers bored, while in a mostly positive review Entertainment Weekly stated "Invasion is at least as involving as any of the current variations on Star Trek, and handsomer to look at than all of them. B+".

Versions 
DreamWorks released two versions, one being edited for younger audiences. The edited version was aired on Kids' WB, while the uncut version was aired in the prime time lineup on The WB. In addition, the story of Invasion America was never completed, with the series ending with the words "End of Book One."

Novels 
Two novels, specifically an adaptation of the series titled Invasion America and an original prequel novel titled Invasion America: On the Run, have been written in the show's setting. Both were written by Christie Golden.

References

External links 
 

1990s American adult animated television series
1990s American science fiction television series
1998 American television series debuts
1998 American television series endings
American adult animated science fiction television series
English-language television shows
The WB original programming
Kids' WB original shows
Television series by DreamWorks Animation
Television series by DreamWorks Television
Alien invasions in television
Animated television series about extraterrestrial life
Television series about alien visitations
Television shows adapted into novels